The 1992 PGA Championship was the 74th PGA Championship, held August 13–16 at Bellerive Country Club in Town and Country, Missouri, a suburb west of St. Louis. Nick Price won the first of his three major championships, three strokes ahead of runners-up John Cook, Nick Faldo, Jim Gallagher Jr., and Gene Sauers.

This was the second major championship at Bellerive, which hosted the U.S. Open in 1965. The PGA Championship returned to the venue in 2018.

Course layout

Length of the course for its previous major championship:
, par 70 - 1965 U.S. Open

Round summaries

First round
Thursday, August 13, 1992

Second round
Friday, August 14, 1992

Third round
Saturday, August 15, 1992

Final round
Sunday, August 16, 1992

References

External links
PGA.com – 1992 PGA Championship

PGA Championship
Golf in Missouri
Sports in St. Louis
PGA Championship
PGA Championship
PGA Championship